State Route 180A (SR 180A) is a highway in Apache County, Arizona, that runs from its junction with US 180 to SR 61 west of St. Johns. It is an east–west route for the entirety of its  length, though its true direction is more north–south.

Route description

SR 180A follows the original alignment of US 180 before the more direct route from St. Johns to its current junction with SR 180A was built. It heads southeasterly from its western terminus at a junction with US 180 northwest of St. Johns. The eastern terminus of the highway is located at a junction with SR 61 near the community of Concho. SR 180A now serves as a bypass route for eastbound traffic wishing to avoid St. Johns. SR 180A has no junctions with any highways aside from its endpoints.

History
The route was established by the Arizona Department of Transportation in 1974. Since then, the route remains as defined.

Junction list

References

180A
Transportation in Apache County, Arizona